The Temptations Wish It Would Rain is a studio album by the Temptations, released in 1968 via Gordy Records. It was the final release from the group's "Classic-5" era, during which David Ruffin, Eddie Kendricks, Paul Williams, Melvin Franklin, and Otis Williams constituted the Temptations' lineup.

Wish It Would Rain also marks the last Temptations solo album to focus on the classic "Motown Sound", and the last to feature production from Smokey Robinson.

Overview
Included on Wish It Would Rain are the hit singles "I Wish It Would Rain" and "I Could Never Love Another (After Loving You)", both featuring Ruffin on lead vocals and co-written by Motown writer Rodger Penzabene, who committed suicide on New Year's Eve 1967 because of the breakup described in these two songs. "I Wish It Would Rain's" b-side, "I Truly, Truly Believe", is a rare solo showcase for Franklin, the group's bass singer.

The third single, "Please Return Your Love to Me", features Kendricks on lead, and was released in July after Ruffin's departure. The song's b-side, "How Could I Forget" (led by Paul Williams), is not included here, because it was newly recorded on June 29 to accompany the a-side.

Background
Ruffin himself did not sing on "How Can I Forget" because, by late June, he was no longer part of the Temptations. The group had already been dealing with Ruffin's ego clashes and his desire for special treatment for at least a few months, and warded off his desire to have the name of the group changed to "David Ruffin & the Temptations" (in response to The Supremes being renamed "Diana Ross & the Supremes"). After Ruffin failed to show up for a series of engagements in Cleveland, Ohio that month (instead going to visit his then-girlfriend Gail Martin, daughter of Dean Martin, and see her open her own musical show), Otis Williams and the other Temptations decided Ruffin had gone too far and fired him.

Dennis Edwards was brought in as Ruffin's replacement, amidst cries of "Where's David?" from the crowds at live shows, and Ruffin's attempts to jump onstage and steal the microphone from Edwards during the shows. Edwards was officially introduced as the Temptations' new lead singer on July 9, 1968, at a live show in Valley Forge, Pennsylvania, and the group enlisted extra security to prevent Ruffin from attending and disrupting their shows,

Edwards would make his on-record debut with the next Temptations album, Diana Ross & the Supremes Join the Temptations. Starting with the group's next solo studio album, also titled Cloud Nine, producer Norman Whitfield began edging the group towards a Sly & the Family Stone-esque sound (dubbed "psychedelic soul"), using Edwards' gruffer voice as the centerpiece for several psychedelic-based hit singles and albums.

Track listing

Unreleased track
"I Know She's Not a Mannequin" (Johnny Bristol, Shena Dermell, Harvey Fuqua) – lead vocal by David Ruffin – produced by Johnny Bristol. Subsequently, released on Lost and Found: You've Got to Earn It (1962–1968).

Personnel
The Temptations
David Ruffin - vocals (tenor/falsetto/baritone)
Eddie Kendricks - vocals (first tenor/falsetto)
Paul Williams - vocals (second tenor/baritone)
Melvin Franklin - vocals (bass)
Otis Williams - vocals (second tenor/baritone)
with:
The Funk Brothers - instrumentation

References

The Temptations albums
1968 albums
Gordy Records albums
Albums produced by Norman Whitfield
Albums produced by Smokey Robinson
Albums produced by Henry Cosby
Albums produced by Johnny Bristol
Albums produced by Harvey Fuqua
Albums produced by Deke Richards
Albums recorded at Hitsville U.S.A.